Euclides de Cunha may refer to:

 Euclides da Cunha (1866–1909), a Brazilian writer, sociologist and engineer
 Euclides da Cunha Paulista, a municipality in the state of São Paulo, Brazil
 Euclides da Cunha, Bahia, a municipality in the state of Bahia, Brazil